Escuredo is a locality and minor local entity located in the municipality of Quintana del Castillo, in León province, Castile and León, Spain. As of 2020, it has a population of 30.

Geography 
Escuredo is located 66km west-northwest of León, Spain.

References

Populated places in the Province of León